Super 1 may refer to:

Super One (album), an album by SuperM
Kamen Rider Super-1, a Japanese television series
Super One Television, a former name of the Maltese television channel One
Super 1 Foods (disambiguation), several supermarket chains